Ernie Adler (born December 15, 1950) is an American politician who served as a Democratic member of the Nevada Assembly and Senate.

Life and career
Born in Pullman, Washington, Adler attended Whitman College, earned a Bachelor of Arts at the University of California, Santa Barbara, and completed a Juris Doctor at University of San Diego School of Law.

In 1987, Adler was elected to the Nevada Assembly, serving until 1989. He served in the Nevada Senate from 1991 to 1998. He was defeated in his bid for re-election by Mark Amodei in 1998.

References 

1950 births
Living people
People from Pullman, Washington
Democratic Party members of the Nevada Assembly
Democratic Party Nevada state senators
20th-century American politicians
Whitman College alumni
University of San Diego School of Law alumni
University of California, Santa Barbara alumni